St Patrick's GAA is a Gaelic Athletic Association club located in Ballyragget, County Kilkenny, Ireland. Founded in 1954, the club fields teams in both hurling and Gaelic football.

Honours
 All-Ireland Junior Club Hurling Championship (1): 2012
 All-Ireland Intermediate Club Hurling Championship (0) Runner-Up 2018
 Leinster Junior Club Hurling Championship (1): 2011
 Kilkenny Junior Hurling Championship (2): 1978, 2011
 Kilkenny Intermediate Hurling Championship (2) 1979, 2017
 Leinster Intermediate Hurling Championship (1) 2017

References

Notable hurlers

 Kevin Kelly

External links
 St. Patrick's GAA website

Gaelic games clubs in County Kilkenny
Hurling clubs in County Kilkenny
Gaelic football clubs in County Kilkenny